is a Japanese two member hip-hop group. The band's name is a pun on the Japanese pronunciation of hillclimb and the word rhyme. They are best known for their 2009 hit song "Shunkashūtō", which has been certified for 1,000,000 cellphone digital downloads and 1,000,000 ringtone downloads separately. The group was named the New Artist of the Year at the 24th Japan Gold Disc Awards.

In December 2017, group member DJ Katsu was arrested for marijuana possession and subsequently left the group.

Biography 

Hilcrhyme first met when Toc performed at a regular music event called Nettaiya, organised by DJ Katsu. After the event finished in 2005, the pair focused working together as a duo, mostly centering their activities around Niigata.

The pair's first official release together came in March 2007, when they released Nettaiya, a demo album. In July 2008, the group released their debut single, "Mō Byebye", independently through Nao Plan management. Hilcrhyme debuted as a major label artist a later, under Universal.

The group's second major label single, "Shunkashūtō", became a massive digital hit in Japan and brought the group to fame. It has currently sold more than 1,000,000 cellphone digital downloads, 1,000,000 ringtone downloads and 100,000 PC downloads. Since then, the band's next single (a re-release of "Mō Byebye") and their debut single, "Jun'ya to Manami", have been certified for being downloaded more than 100,000 times as a cellphone download.

Their song "Loose Leaf" was selected as the theme of the 2010 drama adaption of manga Flunk Punk Rumble, becoming their first drama tie-in theme song.

On December 1, 2017, group member DJ Katsu was arrested on charges of suspected marijuana possession. On December 4, the group's recording contract with Universal Music was cancelled. DJ Katsu's management contract with the company was also cancelled.

Discography

Albums

Singles

References

External links 
 Official Site 
 Universal Label Site 

Japanese pop music groups
Universal Music Japan artists
Musical groups from Niigata Prefecture
Japanese reggae musical groups